Potaynoy is a rural locality (a settlement) in Rodnichkovskoye Rural Settlement, Nekhayevsky District, Volgograd Oblast, Russia. The population was 3 as of 2010.

Geography 
Potaynoy is located 53 km south of Nekhayevskaya (the district's administrative centre) by road. Upornikovskaya is the nearest rural locality.

References 

Rural localities in Nekhayevsky District